Proteuxoa plaesiospila is a moth of the family Noctuidae. It is found in Australia, where it has been recorded from Queensland.

External links
Australian Faunal Directory

Proteuxoa
Moths of Australia
Moths described in 1939